The Zhongman Petroleum and Natural Gas Group (or ZPEC) is a Chinese oilfield services company.

History
The company was founded in 2003. The company received backing from Sequoia Capital.

Reuters in December 2017 reported the company was in talks with Gazprom Neft to take a stake in the Chonsk oil fields development project in Siberia.

Projects
 - Awarded by Iraqi government a $526.6 million drilling deal for drilling of 66 production oil wells at the West Qurna Two oilfield
 - Awarded by Pakistan Petroleum a US$23 million drilling project in Pakistan in 2018.

References

Drilling rig operators
Oilfield services companies
Service companies of China
Chinese companies established in 2003
Energy companies established in 2003
Technology companies of China